Allium kokanicum is an Old World bulb geophyte, native to mountains parts of Central Asia. It is a bulb-forming perennial up to 20 cm tall with pale red to pale purple flowers.

Distribution
Allium kokanicum is found growing wild from northern Pakistan and northeast Afghanistan, throughout Pamirian Tajikistan, the Tian Shan of Kyrgyzstan and Xinjiang, to Altaic eastern Kazakhstan.

References

External links
 Allium kokanicum inflorescence picture from the University of Osnabrück, Germany

kokanicum
Flora of Central Asia
Plants described in 1875